The Longgu Cave, literally meaning "Dragon Bone Cave", also known as Giant Ape Cave, is a cave located in Longgu Slope, Jintang Village, Gaoping Town, Jianshi County, Enshi City, Hubei Province. It is 120 meters long, 6 to 7 meters high and 2 to 15 meters wide. The Cave is divided into two entrances, east and west, the east entrance is 3.5 meters high and the west entrance is 2 meters high.

In 1970, a field team from the Institute of Vertebrate Paleontology and Paleoanthropology (IVPP) discovered the Longgu Cave in Jiansi County and conducted an official excavation. The Cave spans from 1.2 to 2.5 million years ago and was named "Jianshi Homo Erectus Site" by the IVPP.

From 1970 to 1998, the IVPP and the Hubei Institute of Cultural Relics and Archaeology successively conducted eight excavations here, and they were always searching for new information and new information on the survival and reproduction of ancient humans here.

References

Caves of Hubei
Limestone caves
Homo erectus sites
Enshi Tujia and Miao Autonomous Prefecture